Somchai Kemglad ( born January 26, 1974, in Bangkok –), also familiarly known as Tao (เต๋า) or Tao Somchai is a Thai actor and singer.

Biography & career
Kemglad was born into a poor Thai Mon family in Bangkok, he was raised by his grandmother. While being a student at Debsirin School he was a representative footballer for the school and was also a player for the Thai national team at youth level.

He entered the entertainment industry in the early 90's from recruiting by famous scout Poj Arnon, considered a contemporary teen star with many other celebrities such as Patiparn "Mos" Pataweekarn, Pramote Seangsorn, Sornram "Num" Teppitak, Lift-Oil etc.

His first performance was as a supporting role in the Saturday evening fantasy-drama series Nang Fah Si Rung on Channel 7 in 1990 by Grammy Entertainment in credited "Tao Somchai".

In 1992, he signed with the country's leading entertainment company that rivaled the Grammy Entertainment, RS Promotion, and released several music albums including acting in many dramas and movies as well.

His most famous performance in the '90s was as the protagonist in the 1995 romantic-drama film Romantic Blue, with  contemporaries Suttida "Nook" Kasemsan Na Ayutthaya (who became his imagined couple) and Pramote Saengsorn.

Kemglad other works in the post-20th century are starring in Yuthlert Sippapak's action-comedy series, Killer Tattoo in 2001 and Pattaya Maniac in 2004, among others.

Personal life
He married a fellow entertainer Myria "Nat" Benedetti in 2003 and divorced in 2006.

Kemglad remarried to his current wife in 2009. The couple has two children.

Selected filmography

Films
Hero Haew (1992)
Romantic Blue (1995)
Long June (1996)
Friendship Breakdown (1999) 
Killer Tattoo (2001)   
Pattaya Maniac (2004)
Opapatika (2007)
Teng Nong Kon Maha Hia (2007)
In the Shadow of the Naga (2008)
Teng Nong Jee Worn Bin (2011)
The Unborn Child (2011)
The Gangster (2012)
Spicy Beauty Queen of Bangkok 2 (2012)
Young Bao The Movie (2013)
Inspector Mad Dog (2013)
The Unreasonable Man (2014)
Fearless Love (2022)

Television series
Nang Fah Si Rung (1990)
Narm Sai Jai Jing (1994)
Khao Plueak (1994)
Ko Sawat Hat Sawan (1996)
Pee Nueng Puen Gun Lae Won As Sa Jan Khong Phoom (1996)
Bangrajun (2015)
Ban Lang Mek (2015)
The Legendary Outlaw (2016)
The Legendary Outlaw 2 (2018)
Romantic Blue: The Series (2020)

Selected discography

Studio albums
Tao Hua Joke (1993)
Somchai Jod Plai Tao (1995)
Somchai 100 Raeng Ma (1998)

Special albums
Somchai O.T. (1995)

Awards 
Suphannahong National Film Awards (1995) (Best Actor)
Golden Doll Awards 2001 (Best Actor)

Notes

External links 
 

Living people
1974 births
Somchai Kemglad
Somchai Kemglad
Somchai Kemglad
Somchai Kemglad
Somchai Kemglad
Somchai Kemglad
Somchai Kemglad
Somchai Kemglad
Somchai Kemglad
Somchai Kemglad